Çiftlik is a small village in the Marmaris district, Muğla Province, Turkey. It is a popular first-day stay for yachts sailing west to Marmaris. There are 4 restaurants with moorings, offering free fresh water, electricity, and wireless internet. There is also one hotel in the bay, the Green Platan. An island on the south provides shelter in the bay from Meltimi.

Villages in Muğla Province
Marmaris District